Christopher or Chris Dyer may refer to:
Christopher Dyer, academic and historian
Christopher Dyer (politician), LGBT activist and politician based in Washington, DC
Chris Dyer (engineer) (born 1968), racing engineer
Chris Dyer (artist) (born 1979), Canadian artist

See also
Christopher Dye (born 1956), World Health Organization official